This is a list of actors who appeared in the long-running science fiction television series, The X-Files.

A
 Andrew Airlie ("The Jersey Devil")
 Krista Allen ("First Person Shooter")
 Christopher Allport ("Lazarus")
 Lauren Ambrose ("Babylon", "My Struggle II")
 Robbie Amell ("Babylon", "My Struggle II")
 Erich Anderson ("Invocation")
 Michael J. Anderson ("Humbug")
 Sam Anderson ("The Pine Bluff Variant")
 Zachary Ansley ("Pilot")
 Samaire Armstrong ("Lord of the Flies")
 Tim Armstrong ("Home Again")
 Madeleine Arthur ("Ghouli")
 Edward Asner ("How the Ghosts Stole Christmas")
 Jayne Atkinson ("Fearful Symmetry")
 Erick Avari ("Lord of the Flies")
 Nicki Aycox ("Rush")
 John Aylward ("Sunshine Days")

B
 Steve Bacic ("Soft Light", "Pusher", "Folie a Deux")
 Scott Bairstow ("Miracle Man")
 Gillian Barber ("Ghost in the Machine", "Red Museum")
 Raymond J. Barry ("Little Green Men", "Nisei", "S.R. 819")
 Frances Bay ("Excelsis Dei")
 Jim Beaver ("Field Trip")
 Henry Beckman ("Squeeze", "Tooms", "Chinga")
 Jason Beghe ("Darkness Falls")
 James Bell ("Squeeze")
 Marshall Bell ("Fallen Angel")
 Tobin Bell ("Brand X")
 Richard Belzer ("Unusual Suspects")
 Paul Ben-Victor ("Tooms")
 Matthew Bennett ("The Host")
 Abraham Benrubi ("Arcadia")
 Daniel Benzali ("Fresh Bones")
 Xander Berkeley ("Ice")
 Michael Berryman ("Revelations")
 Richard Beymer ("Sanguinarium")
 Casey Biggs ("Vienen")
 John Billingsley ("Three of a Kind")
 Raye Birk ("War of the Coprophages")
 Jack Black ("D.P.O.")
 Rubén Blades ("El Mundo Gira") 
 Susan Blommaert ("Die Hand Die Verletzt")
 Sam Bottoms ("Revelations")
 Dennis Boutsikaris ("Brand X")
 Michael Ray Bower ("First Person Shooter")
 Tom Bower ("Rush")
 Lombardo Boyar ("X-Cops")
 Lynda Boyd ("Fire", "F. Emasculata")
 Katy Boyer ("Hellbound")
 Peter Boyle ("Clyde Bruckman's Final Repose")
 W. Earl Brown ("Underneath")
 Michael Bublé ("Piper Maru")
 Tara Buck ("Orison")
 A.J. Buckley ("War of the Coprophages")
 Genevieve Buechner ("Nothing Lasts Forever")
 Jere Burns ("Nothing Lasts Forever")
 Darren E. Burrows ("Monday")
 Dan Butler ("Die Hand Die Verletzt")
 Tom Butler ("Ghost in the Machine")

C
 R.D. Call ("Miracle Man")
 Bruce Campbell ("Terms of Endearment")
 Ron Canada ("Empedocles")
 Timothy Carhart ("2Shy")
 Alex Carter ("Familiar")
 Christine Cavanaugh ("Small Potatoes")
 Garry Chalk ("Babylon")
 Erin Chambers ("Familiar")
 Stuart Charno ("Clyde Bruckman's Final Repose")
 François Chau ("Ghouli")
 Lilyan Chauvin ("The Calusari")
 Nick Chinlund ("Irresistible", "Orison")
 Eric Christmas ("Excelsis Dei")
 Debra Christofferson ("Arcadia")
 Julian Christopher ("My Struggle II")
 Charles Cioffi ("Pilot")
 Dick Clark ("Millenium")
 Helene Clarkson ("The Calusari")
 Kristen Cloke ("The Field Where I Died", "Rm9sbG93ZXJz")
 Robert Clothier ("Red Museum", "Piper Maru")
 Randall "Tex" Cobb ("Fight Club")
 Frederick Coffin ("Fallen Angel")
 Signy Coleman ("Unusual Suspects", "Three of a Kind")
 Brendan Patrick Connor ("Kitten")
 Scott Cooper ("Rush")
 Matt Corboy ("Rm9sbG93ZXJz")
 Ben Cotton ("Ghouli")
 Bernie Coulson ("Anasazi")
 Richard Cox ("Brand X")
 Bryan Cranston ("Drive")
 Denise Crosby ("Empedocles", "Essence")
 Garvin Cross ("Fearful Symmetry", "Herrenvolk")
 Melinda Culea ("Alpha")
 Colin Cunningham ("End Game", "731", "Wetwired")
 John Cygan ("Blood")

D
 Rhys Darby ("Mulder and Scully Meet the Were-Monster")
 Lisa Darr ("Underneath")
 Don S. Davis ("Beyond the Sea", "One Breath")
 David Denman ("Field Trip")
 Catherine Dent ("Trevor")
 William Devane ("The Truth")
 Cliff DeYoung ("Pilot")
 Dale Dickey ("Existence")
 John Diehl ("Trevor")
 Garret Dillahunt ("Travelers")
 Badja Djola ("The List")
 Michael Dobson ("Jose Chung's From Outer Space")
 Chad Donella ("Hungry")
 Aaron Douglas ("Founder's Mutation")
 Brad Dourif ("Beyond the Sea")
 Bill Dow ("The Jersey Devil")
 Ann Dowd ("Rush")
 Billy Drago ("Theef")
 Minnie Driver ("Hollywood A.D.")
 Thomas F. Duffy ("Alpha")
 Nora Dunn ("Dreamland", "Dreamland II")
 Wayne Duvall ("Ghost in the Machine")
 Eugene Dynarski ("Patience")

E
Rodney Eastman ("Invocation")
Tracey Ellis ("Oubliette")("Audrey Pauley")
Michael Emerson ("Sunshine Days")
Bradford English ("Patience")
 The Enigma ("Humbug")
R. Lee Ermey ("Revelations")
Christine Estabrook ("Young at Heart")
Art Evans ("Fight Club")

F
 Michael Fairman ("Synchrony")
 David Faustino ("Sunshine Days")
 Myles Ferguson ("F. Emasculata", "Schizogeny")
 Louis Ferreira ("Ghouli")
 Gavin Fink ("Scary Monsters")
 Christine Firkins ("Within", "Without")
 Frances Fisher ("Essence")
 Colleen Flynn ("Detour", "all things")
 Megan Follows ("Per Manum")
 Ken Foree ("The List")
 Jodie Foster ("Never Again")
 Colby French ("Millennium")
 Michael Bryan French ("Deep Throat")
 Joseph Fuqua ("Synchrony")
 Jim Fyfe ("Three of a Kind", "Jump the Shark")

G
 M. C. Gainey ("Vienen")
 Lorena Gale ("Shadows")
 Spencer Garrett ("Sein und Zeit")
 Willie Garson ("The Walk", "The Goldberg Variation")
 Brian George ("The Sixth Extinction II: Amor Fati")
 Ashlyn Gere ("Blood")
 Marcus Giamatti ("Jump the Shark")
 Don Gibb ("Conduit")
 William Gibson ("First Person Shooter")
 Matthew Glave ("The Truth")
 Trevor Goddard ("Triangle")
 Mike Gomez ("Little Green Men")
 Walter Gotell ("Paper Clip")
 Beth Grant ("Signs and Wonders")
 Jason Gray-Stanford ("The Jersey Devil")
 Seth Green ("Deep Throat")
 Ellen Greene ("Improbable")
 Kim Greist ("Invocation")
 Zach Grenier ("Alone")
 David Alan Grier ("Hollywood A.D.")
 Jon Gries ("Sleepless")
 Kathy Griffin ("Fight Club")
 David Groh ("Kaddish")
 Arye Gross ("Salvage")
 Gary Grubbs ("Our Town")

H
 Stacy Haiduk ("all things")
 Carrie Hamilton ("Monday")
 Laura Harris ("Die Hand Die Verletzt")
 Anthony Harrison ("Conduit")
 John Hawkes ("Milagro")
 Anthony Heald ("Closure")
 Lance Henriksen ("Millennium")
 Jimmy Herman ("Shapes")
 Barbara Hershey ("My Struggle III")
 Grant Heslov ("Via Negativa")
 Jennifer Hetrick ("Avatar")
 Matt Hill ("Fresh Bones")
 Judith Hoag ("Hungry")
 Susan Lee Hoffman ("Synchrony")
 Laurie Holden ("Herrenvolk, Teliko, Tunguska (The X-Files), Unrequited (The X-Files), Zero Sum (The X-Files), Patient X (The X-Files), The Red and the Black (The X-Files), One Son, Requiem (The X-Files), The Truth (The X-Files)")
 Sandrine Holt ("This")
 James Hong ("Hell Money")
 Michael Horse ("Shapes")
 Rance Howard ("My Struggle")
 Rhys Huber ("The Jersey Devil")
 Felicity Huffman ("Ice")
 Alf Humphreys ("Space", "The Blessing Way", "Detour")
 Brian Huskey ("The Lost Art of Forehead Sweat")
 Doug Hutchison ("Squeeze", "Tooms")
 Scott Hylands ("Unrequited")
 Steve Hytner ("Ice")

I
 Frankie Ingrassia ("The Rain King")
 Katharine Isabelle ("Schizogeny")
 Željko Ivanek ("Roland")

J
 Victoria Jackson ("The Rain King")
 Colton James ("Invocation")
 Graham Jarvis ("Young at Heart")
 Anjali Jay ("My Struggle III")
 Ricky Jay ("The Amazing Maleeni")
 Sarah Jeffery ("Ghouli")
 Ken Jenkins ("Medusa")
 Penny Johnson Jerald ("Medusa")
 Andrew Johnston ("Deep Throat", "Colony", "End Game", "Demons")
 O-Lan Jones ("Sanguinarium")
 Kathryn Joosten ("Trust No 1")

K
 Hiro Kanagawa ("Firewalker", "Synchrony", "My Struggle")
 Caroline Kava ("Our Town")
 Eric Keenleyside ("All Souls")
 Lisa Robin Kelly ("Syzygy")
 Kari Kennell ("Hellbound")
 Janet Kidder ("Babylon")
 Patrick Kilpatrick ("Surekill")
 Ken Kirzinger ("Ice")
 Tuesday Knight ("Trevor")
 Mickey Knox ("S.R. 819")
 Jeff Kober ("Ice")
 Karin Konoval ("Clyde Bruckman's Final Repose", "Home", "Plus One")
Ken Kramer ("War of the Coprophages")
 Kay E. Kuter ("The Calusari")

L
 Rob LaBelle ("Ghost in the Machine")
 Shia LaBeouf ("The Goldberg Variation")
 Tyler Labine ("War of the Coprophages", "Quagmire", "Mulder and Scully Meet the Were-Monster")
 Caroline Lagerfelt ("The Gift")
 Campbell Lane ("Miracle Man", "The Calusari", "Tunguska", "Terma")
 Robert LaSardo ("The Amazing Maleeni")
 Sydney Lassick ("Elegy")
 Ed Lauter ("Space")
 Lucy Lawless ("Nothing Important Happened Today" Parts One and Two)
 Gene LeBell ("Fight Club")
 Kristin Lehman ("Kill Switch")
 Fredric Lehne ("Travelers", "The Unnatural")
 Téa Leoni ("Hollywood A.D.")
 Mimi Lesseos ("Fight Club")
 Jonathan Levit ("The Amazing Maleeni")
 David Lewis ("The Jersey Devil", "Firewalker", "Oubliette")
 Geoffrey Lewis ("Tithonus")
 Andrea Libman ("Born Again")
 Cody Lightning ("The Truth")
 Lucy Liu ("Hell Money")
 Ernie Lively ("D.P.O.")
 Robyn Lively ("Field Trip")
 Stephen Lobo ("Babylon")
 Donal Logue ("Squeeze")
 Brad Loree ("3", "Leonard Betts", "Unusual Suspects")
 William Lucking ("Jose Chung's From Outer Space")
 Carl Lumbly ("Teliko")
 Jane Lynch ("Lord of the Flies")

M
 Annet Mahendru ("My Struggle")
 Wendie Malick ("The Beginning")
 Stuart Margolin ("The Lost Art of Forehead Sweat")
 Brian Markinson ("Born Again")
 Jesse L. Martin ("Irresistible", "The Unnatural")
 Benito Martinez ("The Beginning")
 Tom Mason ("Avatar")
 Michael Massee ("The Field Where I Died")
 Tom McBeath ("Space", "3", "Teso Dos Bichos")
 Heather McComb ("Die Hand Die Verletzt")
 Paul McCrane ("Leonard Betts")
 Neal McDonough ("Provenance", "Providence")
 Darren McGavin ("Travelers", "Agua Mala")
 Jack McGee ("Fight Club")
 Paul McGillion ("Small Potatoes")
 Richard McGonagle ("Deadalive")
 Michael McGrady ("The Gift")
 Melinda McGraw ("One Breath", "The Blessing Way", "Paper Clip", "Christmas Carol")
 Joel McHale ('My Struggle", "My Struggle II")
 Stephen McHattie ("Nisei", "731")
 Michael McKean ("Dreamland", "Dreamland II", "Three of a Kind", "Jump the Shark")
 Ray McKinnon ("Improbable")
 Kate McNeil ("Theef")
 Kevin McNulty ("Squeeze", "Soft Light")
 Jamie McShane ("Providence")
 Micole Mercurio ("Roland")
 Tracy Middendorf ("Signs and Wonders")
 John Milford ("Our Town")
 Gabrielle Miller ("Our Town", "Syzygy")
 Joel McKinnon Miller ("Agua Mala")
 Ty Miller ("Shapes")
 Deanna Milligan ("Irresistible")
 Judson Mills ("X-Cops")
 Silas Weir Mitchell ("Agua Mala")
 Zakes Mokae ("Teliko")
 Darin Morgan ("The Host", "Small Potatoes")
 Glenn Morshower ("All Souls")
 Janne Mortil ("Teso Dos Bichos")
 Joe Morton ("Redrum")
 Tegan Moss ("One Breath", "Piper Maru")
 Lachlan Murdoch ("The Jersey Devil")
 George Murdock ("The Red and the Black", "The End", "The Beginning", "Two Fathers")

N
Kumail Nanjiani ("Mulder and Scully Meet the Were-Monster")
Arthur J. Nascarella ("Underneath")
Eric Nenninger ("Signs and Wonders")
Omari Newton ("Founder's Mutation")
Dean Norris ("F. Emasculata")
Marilyn Norry ("Memento Mori")
Tom Noonan ("Paper Hearts")

O
Conor O'Farrell ("Roadrunners")
John O'Hurley ("The Post-Modern Prometheus")
Shannon O'Hurley ("Brand X")
William O'Leary ("Roadrunners")
Michael O'Neill ("Drive")
Terry O'Quinn ("Aubrey", "Trust No 1")
Cyril O'Reilly ("Hellbound")
Randy Oglesby ("Signs and Wonders")
Ty Olsson ("Kitsunegari")
Leland Orser ("Firewalker")
Holmes Osborne ("Millennium")
Haley Joel Osment ("Kitten")

P
 Joel Palmer ("Conduit")
 F. William Parker ("Chimera")
 Aaron Paul ("Lord of the Flies")
 Amanda Pays ("Fire")
 Mark Pellegrino ("Hungry")
 Emily Perkins ("All Souls")
 Bobbie Phillips ("War of the Coprophages")
 Tom Pickett ("Shadows")
 Byrne Piven ("Paper Hearts")
 Vic Polizos ("Pusher")
 Brian Poth ("Scary Monsters")
 CCH Pounder ("Duane Barry")
 Lawrence Pressman ("Roadrunners")
 Cynthia Preston ("Folie à Deux")
 Barry Primus ("Shadows")
 John Prosky ("Jump the Shark")
 John Pyper-Ferguson ("F Emasculata") ("Emily") ("Christmas Carol")

R
 Natalie Radford ("The Gift")
 Steve Railsback ("Duane Barry", "Ascension")
 Anthony Rapp ("Detour")
 Sarah-Jane Redmond ("Aubrey", "Schizogeny")
 Jed Rees ("Synchrony")
 Perrey Reeves ("3")
 Lee Reherman ("Vienen")
 Charles Nelson Reilly ("Jose Chung's From Outer Space")
 James Remar ("Daemonicus")
 Patrick Renna ("Bad Blood")
 Callum Keith Rennie ("Lazarus", "Fresh Bones")
 Burt Reynolds ("Improbable")
 Ryan Reynolds ("Syzygy")
 Giovanni Ribisi ("D.P.O.")
 Miles Robbins ("Ghouli", "My Struggle IV")
 Ryan Robbins ("Founder's Mutation")
 Andrew Robinson ("Alpha")
 Zuleikha Robinson ("Jump the Shark")
 Charles Rocket ("Three of a Kind")
 Channon Roe ("Kaddish")
 Kacey Rohl ("Founder's Mutation")
 Clayton Rohner ("The Rain King")
 Mark Rolston ("Red Museum", "Sein und Zeit")
 Gabrielle Rose ("Deep Throat")
 Jim Rose ("Humbug")
 Teryl Rothery ("Excelsis Dei")
 Rodney Rowland ("Never Again")
 Deep Roy ("Badlaa")
 Jan Rubeš ("Tunguska", "Terma")
 Vyto Ruginis ("Medusa")
 Leon Russom ("Pilot")
 Steve Ryan ("Scary Monsters")

S
 Vik Sahay ("Founder's Mutation")
 Paul Sand ("Red Museum")
 William Sanderson ("Blood")
 Miguel Sandoval ("Vienen")
 Zak Santiago ("Ghouli")
 Will Sasso ("Je Souhaite")
 John Savage ("Død Kalm")
 Doug Savant ("Founder's Mutation")
 Danielle Savre ("Sunshine Days")
 Diana Scarwid ("Kitsunegari")
 Wendy Schaal ("Chimera")
 Vincent Schiavelli ("Humbug")
 Rusty Schwimmer ("Roadrunners")
 Judith Scott ("Medusa")
 Judson Scott ("This is Not Happening", "DeadAlive", "Three Words")
 Rodney Scott ("Rush")
 Nestor Serrano ("Milagro")
 Brent Sexton ("Patience", "Medusa")
 Tony Shalhoub ("Soft Light")
 Garry Shandling ("Hollywood A.D.")
 Stan Shaw ("Audrey Pauley")
 Mark Sheppard ("Fire")
 Sab Shimono ("Excelsis Dei")
 Daryl Shuttleworth ("Home Again")
 Gregory Sierra ("The Jersey Devil")
 Michael B. Silver ("Dreamland", "Dreamland II")
 Isaac C. Singleton Jr. ("Triangle")
 Tucker Smallwood ("Home")
 Allison Smith ("Trust No 1")
 Charles Martin Smith ("F. Emasculata")
 Douglas Smith ("Home")
 Jamil Walker Smith ("Fresh Bones")
 Kurtwood Smith ("Grotesque")
 Shawnee Smith ("Firewalker")
 Carrie Snodgress ("Conduit")
 Mark Snow ("Per Manum")
 Veena Sood ("Shadows")
 Nancy Sorel ("The Walk")
 Sebastian Spence ("Home")
 Octavia Spencer ("Millennium")
 Jerry Springer ("The Post-Modern Prometheus")
 Jewel Staite ("Oubliette")
 Christopher Stanley ("Per Manum", "Empedocles")
 Claire Stansfield ("The Jersey Devil")
 Peter Stebbings ("Gender Bender")
 Sally Stevens ("The Rain King")
 Alexandra Stewart ("Pilot")
 Don Stewart ("Teliko")
 Malcolm Stewart ("Pilot")
 Sarah Strange ("Duane Barry")
 Don Swayze ("Hellbound")
 Keith Szarabajka ("Via Negativa")

T
 Amanda Tapping ("Avatar")
 Lili Taylor ("Mind's Eye")
 Sharon Taylor ("Familiar")
 Jill Teed ("The Jersey Devil")
 Roy Thinnes ("Talitha Cumi" "Herrenvolk" "This Is Not Happening")
 Eddie Kaye Thomas ("Requiem", "This Is Not Happening")
 Susanna Thompson ("Space")
 Kenneth Tigar ('S.R. 819")
 Wayne Tippit ("The Jersey Devil")
 Tony Todd ("Sleepless")
 Lily Tomlin ("How the Ghosts Stole Christmas")
 Gordon Tootoosis ("Teso Dos Bichos")
 Ian Tracey ("The Walk")
 Saxon Trainor ("Per Manum")
 Alex Trebek ("Jose Chung's From Outer Space")
 Danny Trejo ("Redrum")
 Judd Trichter ("Requiem", "This Is Not Happening")
 Kett Turton ("The Pine Bluff Variant")

U
Andy Umberger ("Requiem")
Jay Underwood ("Empedocles")

V
 Justina Vail ("3")
 Rob Van Dam ("Fight Club")
 Jesse Ventura ("Jose Chung's From Outer Space")
 Pruitt Taylor Vince ("Unruhe")
 Daniel von Bargen ("The Pine Bluff Variant")

W
 Shangela Laquifa Wadley ("Mulder and Scully Meet the Were-Monster")
 George D. Wallace ("Hellbound")
 J. T. Walsh ("The List")
 M. Emmet Walsh ("The Unnatural")
 Lisa Waltz ("Shadows")
 Jerry Wasserman ("Tooms", "Excelsis Dei")
 Kellie Waymire ("Surekill")
 Fritz Weaver ("Tunguska", "Terma")
 Timothy Webber ("Tooms", "Our Town", "Quagmire")
 Kevin Weisman ("Je Souhaite")
 Bruce Weitz ("Irresistible")
 Michael Welch ("Badlaa")
 Frank Welker ("Fearful Symmetry", "Teso Dos Bichos", "Patience")
 Titus Welliver ("Darkness Falls")
 Kenneth Welsh ("Revelations")
 Floyd "Red Crow" Westerman ("Anasazi", "The Blessing Way", "Paper Clip", "Biogenesis", "The Sixth Extinction II: Amor Fati")
 Maggie Wheeler ("Born Again")
 Dana Wheeler-Nicholson ("Syzygy")
 Bernard White ("This is Not Happening")
 Peter White ("Arcadia")
 Ted White ("Dreamland")
 Dondré Whitfield ("Within")
 Bradley Whitford ("Firewalker")
 Christine Willes ("Irresistible", "The Căluşari", "Elegy", "Founder's Mutation)
 Dick Anthony Williams ("Young at Heart")
 Wade Williams ("Salvage")
 Luke Wilson ("Bad Blood")
 Scott Wilson ("Orison")
 Robert Wisden ("Pusher", "Kitsunegari")
 Michael Wiseman ("Lord of the Flies")
 Rebecca Wisocky ("Founder's Mutation")
 Karen Witter ("D.P.O.")
 David Wohl ("Kaddish")
 BD Wong ("Hell Money")
 Bokeem Woodbine ("The List")
 Morgan Woodward ("Aubrey")
 Nicholas Worth ("The Goldberg Variation")

Y
 Bellamy Young ("Redrum")
 Bruce A. Young ("Fresh Bones")
 Dey Young ("Born Again")
 Harris Yulin ("Hollywood A.D.")

Z
 Kevin Zegers ("Revelations")
 Constance Zimmer ("First Person Shooter")

Sources

See also
 List of regular and semi-regular appearances on The X-Files
 List of writers of The X-Files
 List of awards and nominations received by The X-Files

Guest appearances
X-Files Guest
X-Files Guest